Iwo Jima LORAN-C transmitter was a LORAN-C transmitter at Iwo Jima, Japan of Grid 9970 at . The Iwo Jima LORAN-C transmitter had a transmission power of 4 megawatts, which is more than the most powerful broadcasting stations.  The Iwo Jima LORAN-C transmitter had a 411.5 meter (1350 ft) tall guyed mast, which was built in 1963. A guy wire insulator eyebolt failed sending the insulator crashing into the tower, knocking it out of plumb. It collapsed in 1964 on repair of the structural damage caused by the insulator. The collapsing tower killed four construction contract workers, three on the tower and one on the ground. The collapse also destroyed the transmitter building.

The tower was later replaced by another tower of the same height. On September 29, 1993 the Iwo Jima LORAN-C transmitter was transferred from the U.S. Coast Guard to the Government of Japan. In 1994, the transmitter was shut down, and its tower was demolished. After closing the Iwo Jima transmitter, the service had been provided by the Niijima LORAN-C transmitter. The Niijima transmitter was shut down on February 1, 2014.

See also
 List of masts
 List of catastrophic collapses of broadcast masts and towers

External links
 http://lists.contesting.com/_towertalk/1997-04/msg00099.html
 http://skyscraperpage.com/cities/?buildingID=57086
 http://skyscraperpage.com/cities/?buildingID=57087
 
 Google Maps: Former site

LORAN-C transmitters in Japan
Volcano Islands